Nick & Simon are a Dutch singer-songwriter duo composed of Simon Keizer and Nick Schilder. They became popular in their home country the Netherlands in 2006. Their album Luister (Listen) reached double platinum status in four months. In June 2011 they tried to find "the American Dream" in their own TV documentary show, Nick & Simon, The American Dreamteam.

Nick made his first TV appearance on the show Idols, the Dutch version of Idol, where he finished in 11th place. Shortly after, Nick and Simon began to perform together. They were the most booked artists in the Netherlands in 2007.

The duo were coaches in the first three seasons of The Voice of Holland. Nick & Simon did not return for the fourth season.

The duo announced they will split up after completing their Nu of Ooit tour, citing wanting more room for individual creativity and having long aspired for solo careers.

Discography

Albums

Studio albums

Live albums

Compilation albums

Singles

As lead artist

Other appearances

Notes

References

Dutch singer-songwriters
Dutch musical duos